Jonathon Tyrone Mincy (born September 5, 1992) is an American football cornerback for the Edmonton Elks of the Canadian Football League (CFL). He was signed by the Atlanta Falcons as an undrafted free agent after the 2015 NFL Draft. He played college football at Auburn. He has also been a member of the Montreal Alouettes and the Chicago Bears.

Professional career

Atlanta Falcons 
On May 5, 2015, Mincy was signed by the Atlanta Falcons as an undrafted free agent after the 2015 NFL Draft. On August 31, he was waived.

Montreal Alouettes 
On June 20, 2016, Mincy was signed to the Montreal Alouettes' practice roster. He made the active roster and finished his rookie season in the CFL with 54 tackles, an interception, and two forced fumbles. The next season, he recorded 54 tackles and two interceptions. On November 8, 2017, Mincy was named as an Eastern Division All-Star. On December 4, 2017, Mincy was released so he could pursue an opportunity in the NFL.

Chicago Bears 
On January 10, 2018, Mincy was signed by the Chicago Bears to a reserve/future contract. He was waived on September 1, 2018 and was signed to the practice squad the next day. He signed a reserve/future contract with the Bears on January 8, 2019. On August 31, 2019, Mincy was waived by the Bears.

Toronto Argonauts 
On September 18, 2019 Mincy was signed to the Toronto Argonauts' practice roster.

Edmonton Eskimos / Elks 
Mincy signed with the Edmonton Elks on a contract extension through 2022 on December 26, 2020.

References 

1992 births
Living people
People from Decatur, Georgia
Players of American football from Georgia (U.S. state)
Sportspeople from DeKalb County, Georgia
American football defensive backs
Canadian football defensive backs
American players of Canadian football
Auburn Tigers football players
Atlanta Falcons players
Montreal Alouettes players
Chicago Bears players
Toronto Argonauts players
Edmonton Elks players